The 2018 Tennessee Volunteers baseball team represented the University of Tennessee in the 2018 NCAA Division I baseball season.  The Volunteers played their home games at Lindsey Nelson Stadium. The team was coached by Tony Vitello in his first season as head coach at Tennessee.

Roster

Schedule

Record vs. conference opponents

References

Tennessee Volunteers
Tennessee Volunteers baseball seasons
Volunteers baseball